Proto-Berber or Proto-Libyan is the reconstructed proto-language from which the modern Berber languages descend. Proto-Berber was an Afroasiatic language, and thus its descendant Berber languages are cousins to the Egyptian language,  Cushitic languages, Semitic languages, Chadic languages, and the Omotic languages.

History
Proto-Berber shows features that clearly distinguish it from all other branches of Afroasiatic, but modern Berber languages are relatively homogeneous. Whereas the split from the other known Afroasiatic branches was very ancient, on the order of 10,000~9,000 years ago, according to glottochronological studies, Proto-Berber might be as recent as 3,000 years ago. Louali & Philippson (2003) propose, on the basis of the lexical reconstruction of livestock-herding, a Proto-Berber 1 (PB1) stage around 7,000 years ago and a Proto-Berber 2 (PB2) stage as the direct ancestor of contemporary Berber languages.

In the third millennium BC, proto-Berber speakers spread across the area from Morocco to Egypt. In the last millennium BC, another Berber expansion created the Berber peoples noted in Roman records. The final spread occurred in the first millennium AD, when the Tuareg, now possessing camels, moved into the central Sahara; in the past, the northern parts of the Sahara were much more inhabitable than they are now.

The fact that there are reconstructions for all major species of domestic ruminants but none for the camel in Proto-Berber implies that its speakers produced livestock and were pastoralists.

Another dating system is based on examining the differences that characterize ancient stages of Semitic and Egyptian in the third millennium BC. Many researchers have estimated the differences to have taken 4,000 years to evolve, resulting in breaking this language family in six distinct groups (Semitic, Egyptian, Berber, Cushitic, Chadic and Omotic) in the eighth millennium BC. Proto-Afroasiatic is thus from the tenth millennium since it took at least 2,000 years before it reached the stage where these different branches of this language family evolved.

From that perspective, Proto-Berber was the first Berber stage to depart from Proto-Afroasiatic in the eighth millennium. It was restructured several times during the almost 10,000 years that separated it from its modern shape, which has preserved few relics.

Roger Blench (2018) suggests that Proto-Berber speakers had spread from the Nile River valley to North Africa 4,000–5,000 years ago due to the spread of pastoralism, and experienced intense language leveling about 2,000 years ago as the Roman Empire was expanding in North Africa. Hence, although Berber had split off from Afroasiatic several thousand years ago, Proto-Berber itself can only be reconstructed to a period as late as 200 A.D. Blench (2018) notes that Berber is considerably different from other Afroasiatic branches, but modern-day Berber languages displays low internal diversity. The presence of Punic borrowings in Proto-Berber points to the diversification of modern Berber language varieties subsequent to the fall of Carthage in 146 B.C.; only Guanche and Zenaga lack Punic loanwords. Additionally, Latin loanwords in Proto-Berber point to the breakup of Proto-Berber between 0–200 A.D. During this time period, Roman innovations including the ox-plough, camel, and orchard management were adopted by Berber communities along the limes, or borders of the Roman Empire. In Blench's view, this resulted in a new trading culture involving the use of a lingua franca which became Proto-Berber.

Reconstructions
Reconstructions of the ancient stages of this language are based on comparisons with other Afro-Asiatic languages in various stages and on the comparisons between the varieties of modern Berber languages or with Touareg, considered by some authors like Prasse to be the variety that best preserved proto-Berber.

Phonology
Some earlier attempts to derive the phonemic inventory of Proto-Berber were heavily influenced by Tuareg because of its perception of being particularly archaic.

Vowels
Karl G. Prasse and Maarten Kossmann reconstruct three short vowels /a/, /i/, /u/ and four long vowels /aa/, /ii/, /uu/ and /ee/. Their main reflexes in modern Berber languages are shown in the following table:

Tuareg and Ghadames also have /o/, which seems to have evolved from /u/ by vowel harmony in Tuareg and from *aʔ in Ghadames.

Allati has reconstructed a Proto-Berber vocalic system made of six vowels: i, u, e,  o, a.                                                            
Without the long vowels that are not Proto-Afroasiatic (cf. Diakonoff, 1965 : 31, 40 ; Bomhard et Kerns, 1994 : 107, among others) and that evolved in some modern Berber varieties (Toureg, Ghadames, ...), the system is preserved in the southeastern Berber varieties including Tuareg. It is equally close to the proposed Proto-Afroasiatic vocalic system (Diakonoff, 1965, 1988).

Alexander Militarev reconstructs the vowels /a/, /i/, /u/ in his proto-forms.

Consonants
Kossmann reconstructs the following consonantal phonemes for Proto-Berber:

As in modern Berber languages, most Proto-Berber consonants had a homorganic tense counterpart, with the sole exceptions of *β, *ʔ.

The consonants *ɟ and *g have remained distinct in some Zenati languages:

Similarly, Proto-Berber *c, corresponding to k in non-Zenati varieties, became š in Zenati (but a number of irregular correspondences for this are found). For example, căm "you (f. sg.)" becomes šəm. (The change also occurs in Nafusi and Siwi.)

Eastern Berber languages:
 → 

Proto-Berber *-əβ has become -i in Zenati.  For example, *arəβ "write" becomes ari.  (This change also occurs in varieties including the Central Atlas Tamazight dialect of the Izayan, Nafusi, and Siwi.)

Ghadamès and Awjila are the only Berber languages to preserve Proto-Berber *β as β; elsewhere in Berber it becomes h or disappears.

The Proto-Berber consonantal system reconstructed by Allati (cf. Allati, 2002, 2011) is based on remains from the ancient stages of this language preserved in the ancient toponymical strata, in Libyan inscriptions and in the modern Berber varieties. It had stops b, t, d, k, g; fricative s; nasal n and liquids l, r. The stops of the phonological system have evolved since the proto-Berber stage into variants from which other consonants have been progressively formed (Allati, 2002, 2011).

Grammar
Karl G. Prasse has produced a comprehensive reconstruction of Proto-Berber morphology based on Tuareg. Additional work on the reconstruction of Proto-Berber morphology was done by Maarten Kossmann.

Proto-Berber had no grammatical case. Its descendants developed a marked nominative that is still present in Northern Berber and Southern Berber/Tuareg. Some Berber languages lost it thereafter, recently in Eastern Berber and Western Berber (Zenaga).

Independent personal pronouns

Kinship

The relics of the ancient morphological segments preserved in the modern varieties, in the Libyan inscriptions and in the ancient toponymical strata show that the basis of word formation is a monosyllabic lexical unit (vc, cvc) whose vowels and consonants are part of the root.

Its forms and its characteristics are similar to those of the base of word formation postulated for proto-Afroasiatic. The composition and the reduplication/doubling process whose traces are preserved in all the Afroasiatic branches, including Semitic where they are fossilized  in the quadrilaterals and quintiliterals, constitute the type of word formation at that stage of Berber.

These remains also show that agglutination is the Proto-Berber mode of the grammatical adjunction of morphemes whose placement was not fixed in relation to the elements that they determine (cf. Allati, 2002, 2011b/c, 2012, 2013, 2014). The relations between the predicate of existence, the core of the utterance in the proto-Berber stage, and its determinants ordered around it without a pre-established order, are indicated with affixes (cf. idem).

The Proto-Berber relics preserved at the lexico-semantic and syntactic levels show that the proto-Berber syntactic construction is of the ergative type (cf. idem). The proto-Berber statement core is a predicate of existence, a lexical base which posits the existence of a fact, of a situation...i.e. it expresses a state, a quality (cf. Allati, 2002, 2011b/c, 2013 below) having the value of a stative (cf. idem et Allati, 2008). It is not oriented in relation to its determinants (agentive subject, object...) whose syntactic functions are insured by casual elements including the casual affix (ergative) that indicates, as needed, the agent or the subject. Similar elements attested in Cushitic, Chadic and Omotic, and remains preserved in Semitic drove Diakonoff to postulate the same type of syntactic construction for proto-Semitic et proto-Afroasiatic (cf. Diakonoff, 1988, 101 ; cf. equally Allati, 2008, 2011a, 2012).
	Many elements equally show that proto-Berber did not have the noun-verb contrast, the rection contrasts, diathesis and person (cf. idem).

References

Bibliography

External links
Proto-Berber etymologies (Alexander Militarev)
Berber languages and Berber peoples: genetic and linguistic diversity
 
 

Berber languages
Berber